A battaglia is a form of Renaissance and Baroque programme music imitating a battle. The Renaissance form is typically in the form of a madrigal for four or more voices where cannons, fanfares, cries, drum rolls, and other noises of a battle are imitated by voices. The Baroque form is more often an instrumental depiction of a battle.

Vocal battaglia works
 Janequin La Guerre or 'La Bataille' - chanson written to commemorate the Battle of Marignano in 1515, first printed in 1529,
 Matthias Werrecore La Battaglia Taliana or Die Schlacht vor Pavia 1544, for 4 voices - after the Battle of Pavia 1525.
 Orazio Vecchi Battaglia d'Amor e Dispetto - an extended madrigal dialogue - allegorical and not related to any battle. But closer to the original battaglia genre than Monteverdi's amor versus guerra, contrasts in that composer's 8th Book of Madrigals.
 Mateo Flecha La Guerra - an ensalada (music) in Spanish
 Claudio Monteverdi  Il combattimento di Tancredi e Clorinda (1624)

Instrumental battaglia works
 Andrea Gabrieli Battaglia à 8 per strumenti da fiato
 William Byrd "The Battell", for keyboard
 Annibale Padovano Battaglia à 8 per strumenti da fiato
 Heinrich Biber: Battalia à 10 for solo violin, strings, and continuo

Later battle music not called battaglia
 Franz Christoph Neubauer: Sinfonie 'La Bataille' -  Battle of Focșani 1789
 Beethoven: Wellington's Victory - requiring muskets and cannons. To be contrasted with Haydn's tribute Battle of the Nile which does not sonically attempt to depict the battle.
 Tchaikovsky: 1812 Ouverture
 Prokofiev: Battle on the ice from Alexander Nevsky - Battle of Lake Peipus, 1242
 Shostakovich: first movement of Leningrad Symphony, despite Shostakovich's disclaimers,
Kurpiński: The Battle of Mozhaisk, also known as Grand Symphony Imagining a Battle.

References

Renaissance music
Baroque music